Butachlor is a herbicide of the acetanilide class.  It is used as a selective pre-emergent herbicide.  It is extensively used in India in the form of granules in rice as post emergence herbicide.

References

Herbicides
Acetanilides
Butyl compounds